Alexanders saga is an Old Norse translation of Alexandreis, an epic Latin poem about the life of Alexander the Great written by Walter of Châtillon, which was itself based on Quintus Curtius Rufus's Historia Alexandri Magni. It is attributed in manuscripts of the saga to Brandr Jónsson, bishop of Skálholt who is also said to have been responsible for authoring Gyðinga saga. Kirsten Wolf has commented on the saga's literary qualities thus: "Alexanders saga [...] has stirred the admiration of scholars and writers for centuries because of its exceptionally imaginative use of the resources of language and its engaging narrative style."

Manuscripts 
Alexanders saga is preserved in five medieval Icelandic manuscripts and a number of later manuscripts, of which only Stock. Papp. fol. no. 1 has independent textual value. The main manuscript source of the text is AM 519a 4to, dating from 1270-1290. A fragment of the saga appears in AM 655 XXIX 4to which dates from the same period. It is also found in AM 226 fol (and its copy AM 225 fol) which contains the Biblical compilation Stjórn. In these manuscripts Alexanders saga comes after Rómverja saga and before Gyðinga saga. In AM 226 fol, AM 225 fol, and Stock. Perg. 4to no. 24 the text is shorter than AM 519a 4to and also contain a translation of Epistola Alexandri ad Aristotelem.

Kalinke and Mitchell identified the following manuscripts of the saga:

Editions

Further reading

References 

Old Norse literature
Sagas